Chief medical officer (CMO) is the title used in many countries for the senior government official designated head of medical services, sometimes at the national level. The post is held by a physician who serves to advise and lead a team of medical experts on matters of public health importance.

The post of chief medical officer dates back to Victorian times. The equivalent title may go under different names across countries, for example, the Surgeon General in the United States and the Chief Public Health Officer in Canada.

By extension, chief medical officer is also used as a job title, for the physician who is the professional lead of all physicians at a hospital.

See also
 Chief Medical Officer (Australia)
 Chief Medical Officer (Ireland)
 Chief Medical Officers (United Kingdom)
 Chief of staff – the highest-ranking physician at a hospital in the US

References

Health officials
Government occupations